Philippides is a Greek name meaning "Son of Philip"; Philip means "lover of horses". Derivative, patronym, of the more common ancient Greek name "Philippos"  Notable people with this name include:
Pheidippides, also known as Philippides, said to have run from Marathon to Athens bringing news of the Greek victory at the battle of Marathon
Philippides (comic poet), flourished 336-333 BC.
Philippides of Paiania, fl. 293/2 BC, wealthy Athenian oligarch